Global National is the English language flagship national newscast of Canada's Global Television Network. Editorial and production staff are based out of Global's national news centre at Global BC in Burnaby, British Columbia, with Dawna Friesen presenting from the Global BC studios Mondays to Thursdays, and Farah Nasser presenting from the Global Toronto studios Fridays to Sundays. From 2008 to 2010, the program was the only Canadian network newscast to be regularly anchored from the nation's capital, Ottawa.

In addition to Global's owned-and-operated stations (O&Os), Global National also airs on affiliate CHFD-DT in Thunder Bay, Ontario and independent station CJON-DT in St. John's, Newfoundland.

Global also produced a Mandarin version of the newscast, titled Global National Mandarin from 2012 to 2016. It was anchored by Carol Wang. The newscast was seen on Shaw Multicultural Channel in Vancouver, British Columbia and Calgary, Alberta.

History
Global's first tentative steps towards a national news presence came in 1994 with the launch of First National, a regional newscast presented by Peter Kent which was aired in Manitoba, Ontario and (starting in 1997) Quebec. Around the same time, the rival WIC television station group launched Canada Tonight, a newscast produced at WIC's Vancouver station CHAN-TV (better known as British Columbia Television or BCTV), and also aired on its stations in Alberta and Ontario.

Following the purchase of WIC's television stations by Global's then-parent company Canwest, Global announced in January 2001 its plans to launch a new network newscast in September of that year, with Kevin Newman returning to Canada from ABC News as the newscast's chief anchor. First National ended production in February, and the Global stations which had aired that program broadcast Canada Tonight in its place until the new newscast launched.

The final broadcast of Canada Tonight aired on August 31, 2001, and the new newscast, titled Global National, debuted on September 3 from a renovated studio at CHAN, which became a Global O&O two days earlier and produces its local newscasts from the same studio.  As part of the deal in which Global bought CHAN, it became home to Global's national news centre; the station had wanted to do a national newscast for its former network CTV (with Canada Tonight emerging as the result after CTV's board turned CHAN's proposal down).  Kevin Newman's name was added to the program's title from the start of its second season. The program initially only aired on weekdays; weekend broadcasts began on February 26, 2005, with Tara Nelson as the anchor. The launch of the weekend editions precipitated the cancellation of the newsmagazine series Global Sunday.

Global National initially aired in different time slots across the country: 5:30 pm in British Columbia, Alberta, Saskatchewan, and Manitoba; 6:30 pm in Ontario and Quebec; and 11:15 pm in the Maritimes. In conjunction with the launch of Global's new visual identity in February 2006, the program began to be aired live at 6:30 pm in the Atlantic Time Zone. This version of the program is then broadcast via satellite tape delay in time zones to the west (at 6:30 Eastern, 5:30 Central, Mountain, and Pacific, and 6:00 on CHBC Kelowna since 2009), with updates if news events warrant. This allows the newscast to air at a uniform time slot across most of the country, as well as to serve as a lead-in to local news in most markets. While strong in Western Canada from day one – particularly in British Columbia, where CHAN has dominated news ratings for four decades – the timeslot change allowed the program's ratings in Ontario to improve significantly as a result of having The Young and the Restless as its lead-in; that show had previously given a strong ratings bump to CIII's local newscast. (On October 11, 2011, CIII moved Global National back to 6:30 p.m. as part of a scheduling shift with its early evening newscast, News Hour.)

It is often difficult to compare Canada's national newscast ratings because the newscasts air at different times. Global decided to cut into their supper hour local newscast ratings to air Global National while rivals CTV and CBC air their national newscasts in the late evening. Despite airing in a more favorable timeslot, Global National is continually out-rated by CTV National News  and maintains a slight lead over CBC's The National.

In February 2008, Newman began presenting the weekday edition of Global National from a specially-built digital newsroom and studio facility in Ottawa. The Ottawa studio's cameras were controlled remotely from CHAN in Vancouver, where the newscast's main editorial and production staff remain. Similar remote-controlled greenscreen studios were introduced at a number of local Global newscasts.

Tara Nelson was named Global's Europe bureau chief in September 2008; her position as the program's weekend anchor was then shared by Carolyn Jarvis on Saturdays and Robin Gill on Sundays. Nelson resigned in October 2010 to become the new 6:00 pm anchor at CTV Calgary, Alberta (CFCN-DT).

Newman announced his departure from the network on April 30, 2010, and anchored the newscast for the last time on August 20, 2010. Dawna Friesen was named as his successor on July 13, 2010, and began anchoring Global National on September 20, 2010.

Carolyn Jarvis was reassigned to Global's newsmagazine program 16:9 in 2011, with Robin Gill taking over as Saturday anchor alongside her pre-existing Sunday hosting duties.

Global National Mandarin
Global National Mandarin was a newscast aired on the Shaw Multicultural Channel in Vancouver and Calgary. On December 6, 2011, Global announced its plans to launch Global National Mandarin (Global National 国语新闻). The 30-minute Mandarin newscast debuted on January 23, 2012, with Carol Wang as anchor. It was announced on June 29, 2016, that Global National Mandarin would air its final broadcast on June 30 as it did not garner the viewership necessary to continue airing. The investigative documentary series 16x9 was also cancelled at this time.

Features
Global National was the first mainstream Canadian newscast to be released as a podcast. In 2006, the download was expanded to include video for playback on a video iPod.

Notable on-air staff

Anchors
 Dawna Friesen - anchor and executive editor (Monday-Thursday)
 Farah Nasser - weekend/substitute anchor (Friday-Sunday)

Correspondents
 Eric Sorensen - Senior National Affairs Correspondent
 Jeff Semple - Global News Senior National Correspondent
 Jackson Proskow - Washington Bureau Chief
 Reggie Cecchini - Washington Correspondent
 Jennifer Johnson - Washington Correspondent
 David Akin - Chief Political Correspondent (Ottawa)
 Mercedes Stephenson - Ottawa Bureau Chief
 Crystal Goomansingh - London Bureau Chief
 Redmond Shannon - London Correspondent
 Mike Armstrong - Quebec Correspondent
 Neetu Garcha - BC Correspondent
 Heather Yourex-West - Alberta Correspondent
 Ross Lord - Atlantic Correspondent

Substitute anchors
Substitute anchors have included:
Chris Gailus (Global BC)
Coleen Christie (Global BC)
Neetu Garcha (Global BC)
Eric Sorenson - Senior National Affairs Correspondent
Sophie Lui (Global BC)
Sonia Deol (Global BC)
David Akin - Chief Political Correspondent
Gord Steinke (Global Edmonton)

Former on-air staff
Patrick Brown: briefly Global's Beijing Bureau,  returned to CBC Television as an independent correspondent 
Carolyn Jarvis: now chief investigative correspondent (was host of 16x9 until it was cancelled in 2016)
Kevin Newman (anchor/executive editor, 2001–2010): formerly host of Kevin Newman Live on CTV News Channel and CTV's Question Period
Tara Nelson (weekend anchor, 2005–2008; Europe bureau chief, 2008–2010): now 6:00 pm anchor at CFCN-DT Calgary, Alberta
 Sean Mallen: former Europe Bureau Chief (based in London), now reporter for Global Toronto
Leslie Roberts: resigned 2015
 Carol Wang: Weeknights (Mandarin anchor, 2012–2016) Shaw Multicultural Channel
Vassy Kapelos: The West Block (Anchor, 2017–2018), now the host of CBC's Power and Politics
 Shirlee Engel: formerly the “National Affairs Correspondent”| now with Compass Rose
Robin Gill - (anchor/primary substitute anchor, 2008–2021): British Columbia correspondent (based in Vancouver)

Former Reporters
 Jas Johal
 Mike Edgel

Current On-Air Reporters
 Redmond Shannon (part-time with London)

See also
Global News

References

External links
Global News - Global National
Global News | Global National 国语新闻 
Press Release: "Global National With Kevin Newman Delivers More Than One Million Canadian Viewers in Its New Timeslot"
Press Release on Global National's move to Ottawa

Global Television Network original programming
2001 Canadian television series debuts
2000s Canadian television news shows
2010s Canadian television news shows
2020s Canadian television news shows
Television shows filmed in Burnaby
Television shows filmed in Toronto
Television series by Corus Entertainment
Flagship evening news shows